Nemanice is a municipality and village in Domažlice District in the Plzeň Region of the Czech Republic. It has about 300 inhabitants.

Administrative parts
Villages and hamlets of Lísková, Nemaničky, Nová Huť, Novosedelské Hutě, Novosedly and Stará Huť are administrative parts of Nemanice.

History
The first written mention of Nemanice is from 1591. The village was founded by the town of Domažlice shortly before this year.

References

Villages in Domažlice District